Dolichovespula is a small genus of social wasps distributed widely throughout the Northern Hemisphere. The yellow and black members of the genus are known by the common name yellowjackets in North America, such as Dolichovespula norwegica, along with members of their sister genus Vespula. In a study on the nesting biology of Dolichovespula, a colony of D. maculata with 771 workers was reported as having the largest recorded population count.

Overview

Several morphological differences distinguish them from Vespula. The most noticeable is the long face (dolikhos = "long" in Greek). Viewed from the front, Dolichovespula faces are long, while Vespula faces are short and round. The oculomalar space, the distance between the eye and the mandible, is long in Dolichovespula and short in Vespula. Dolichovespula nests are usually aerial, while Vespula spp. often nest underground.

Reproduction
All females are born with reproductive capacities. Dolichovespula is unique from its sister group Vespula in that some of the workers create haploid offspring that develop into males.

Species
These species are recognised:

 Dolichovespula adulterina (Buysson, 1905)
 Dolichovespula albida Sladen 1918 – (split from D. norwegica)
 Dolichovespula alpicola Eck 1984 – Rocky Mountain aerial yellowjacket
 Dolichovespula arenaria (Fabricius, 1775) – aerial yellowjacket
 Dolichovespula arctica Rohwer 1918 – parasitic yellowjacket (split from D.adulterina)
 Dolichovespula asiatica Archer, 1981
 Dolichovespula baileyi Archer, 1987
 Dolichovespula carolina (Linnaeus, 1767)
 Dolichovespula flora Archer, 1987
 Dolichovespula kuami Kim, 1996
 Dolichovespula lama (Buysson, 1903)
 Dolichovespula loekenae Eck, 1980 (split from D. pacifica)
 Dolichovespula maculata (Linnaeus, 1763) – bald-faced hornet
 Dolichovespula media (Retz., 1783) – median wasp
 Dolichovespula norvegicoides (Sladen, 1918) – Arctic yellowjacket
 Dolichovespula norwegica (Fabricius 1781) – Norwegian wasp
 Dolichovespula omissa (Bischoff, 1931)
 Dolichovespula pacifica (Birula, 1930)
 Dolichovespula pacifica xanthicincta Archer, 1980
 Dolichovespula panda Archer, 1980
 Dolichovespula saxonica (Fabricius, 1793) – Saxon wasp
 Dolichovespula sinensis (Archer, 1987)
 Dolichovespula stigma Lee 1986
 Dolichovespula sylvestris (Scopoli, 1763) – tree wasp

References

Bald-faced hornet. Baldfacedhornet.net

External links

Vespidae
Taxa named by Sievert Allen Rohwer